The brown-breasted barbet (Lybius melanopterus) is a species of bird in the Lybiidae family.
It is found in Kenya, Malawi, Mozambique, Somalia, and Tanzania.

References

brown-breasted barbet
Birds of East Africa
brown-breasted barbet
brown-breasted barbet
Taxonomy articles created by Polbot
Taxobox binomials not recognized by IUCN